Haverstock is a ward in the London Borough of Camden, in the United Kingdom. The ward has existed since the May 2002 local elections and covers most of the Haverstock and Chalk Farm areas.

In 2018, the ward had an electorate of 9,115. The Boundary Commission projects the electorate to rise to 9,355 in 2025.

History
The ward has been represented by three Labour Party councillors since the 2014 election.

Upon its creation for the 2002 election, the seat elected three Labour councillors. After John Dickie resigned as a councillor in 2003, a by-election was held for the vacant position, which was won by Jill Fraser, a Liberal Democrat, with the Labour candidate coming second. She retained her seat in the 2006 election and was elected alongside two Labour candidates. Labour councillor Roy Shaw resigned his position in 2007 due to ill health, and in the subsequent by-election, Matt Sanders, a Liberal Democrat, was elected over the Labour candidate.

Councillor Syed Hoque defected from the Labour Party to join the Liberal Democrats in 2009, leaving the ward represented by three Liberal Democrats. Hoque's death in 2010 resulted in the 2010 election in Haverstock being delayed from 6 May to 25 May. The Liberal Democrats held all three seats.

Labour regained all three seats in the 2014 election, defeating the incumbent Liberal Democrats, and retained their seats in the 2018 election. In 2019, Abi Wood stood down as a councillor, triggering a by-election held on the same day as the 2019 United Kingdom general election. The by-election was won by the Labour candidate, Gail McAnena Wood.

The ward will undergo minor boundary changes for the 2022 election.

Councillors

Elections

Elections in the 2020s

Elections in the 2010s

Elections in the 2000s

References

Wards of the London Borough of Camden
2002 establishments in England